1966 Presidential Cup was the inaugural edition of the national super cup of Turkish Football Federation. The match was contested between 1965–66 1.Lig champions Beşiktaş and 1965–66 Turkish Cup winners Galatasaray. It was held on an unusual time for a super cup, in September, after the footballing season for 1966–67 1.Lig began.

Match details

See also
 1965–66 1.Lig
 1965–66 Turkish Cup

References

1966
Turkish Super Cup
Presidential Cup 1966
Presidential Cup 1966